Pelican is the University of Western Australia's student magazine. It is financed by the UWA Guild with 1,000 copies of each issue published and distributed across metropolitan Perth, as well as to Notre Dame, Murdoch, Curtin, ECU, and Central TAFE. It is Australia's second oldest student paper, having begun publication in 1929.

Pelican publishes six print editions per year, with approximately three issues per semester. University of Western Australia.  Easily distinguishable by its satire and professional design, Pelican is aimed at Perth's tertiary students and young people aged between 18 and 28 frequenting the inner-metropolitan area. Pelican also has a strong readership among UWA staff and alumni in the 35 to 55-year-old age range. Each print edition is centred on a theme, and includes regular reviews (books, music, television, film, and arts); opinion pieces; campus news; and current affairs analysis.

In 2015, Pelican launched its website and achieved dual platform status. Pelican has an average of 5.6 thousand monthly visitors to this website. It also enjoys 3.6 thousands visits to its Facebook page; over 1,000 monthly visits to its Instagram platform; and 500 monthly visits to its Twitter platform.

History 
Founded in 1929, Pelican lays claim to being the country's second-oldest student newspaper, after Farrago. Originally, Pelican took the form of a weekly current affairs broadsheet. Over the years, it has moved between being a "tabloid"-sized magazine, and having both glossy finishes and newspaper print coves.

Under 2020 editors Bayley Horne and Stirling Kain, the print edition of Pelican is A4 sized, and features a forty-eight page, semi-gloss spread, with eight colour pages.

It has become an ongoing tradition that the Pelican editor appears naked on the front cover of the final edition, although it is unknown when this tradition began. Research by former Pelican editor Henry F. Skerritt, published in his final editorial of 2000, suggests that this tradition began in 1972.

Content 
Typically, each edition of Pelican circulates around a particular theme.  These can be a range of diverse topics such as "Ammunition", "Class", "Superstition", "The Future", "Patriotism", and "Sex". Each Pelican also includes articles that deal more broadly with politics, popular culture, and aspects of the student lifestyle. Pelican also includes coverage of music, books, film, television, and the arts. These are ordered within individual sub-sections, each of which is coordinated by a different section editor.

Voluntary student unionism 
The implementation of voluntary student unionism in 2006 had a significant impact on the viability of student newspapers across Australia, compulsory student union membership fees having been the major source of income for most. Pelican is one of the few Australian papers to have not been affected by these changes, and this can be largely attributed to the high voluntary membership intake of the University of Western Australia Student Guild.

Controversy 
In late 2007, in the lead up to the federal election of that year, UWA student and Australian Labor Party candidate for the seat of O'Connor, Dominic Rose, was caught up in a national controversy over an article published in Pelican. It was revealed that some time before his preselection, the student had written a piece in which he referred to then Labor Party leader and Prime Ministerial hopeful Kevin Rudd as a "filthy Liberal". The story was carried nationally and appeared in major publications, including The Age, news.com.au, The Herald Sun, and the national broadsheet The Australian.

Current editors 
2020 head editors: 
Bayley Horne and Stirling Kain

2020 sub-editors:
Arts: Riva-Jean Lander and Abigail Macleod
Campus news: Courtney Withers
Comedy: Rupert Williamson
Diversity: Elanor Leman 
Economics and finance: Millie Muroi
Film: Lachlan Serventy 
Lifestyle: Cameron Carr
Literature: Elena Perse and Isabelle Yuen 
Music: Ella Fox-Martens 
Politics: Christine Chen 
Science: Paris Javid
Sports: Campbell Williamson
Technology and gaming: Caleb Cheng

Footnotes

References 
 http://www.pelican.guild.uwa.edu.au/editions/71-8/
 https://web.archive.org/web/20090402214342/http://www.guild.uwa.edu.au/home/publications__and__marketing/pelican_student_newspaper
 https://web.archive.org/web/20090510064019/http://www.youthrep.org.au/beth/blog/?page_id=2

Magazines established in 1929
Student magazines
University of Western Australia
Eight times annually magazines
Magazines published in Perth, Western Australia
Student newspapers published in Australia